Call Me Bandicoot is a 1970 young adult novel written by U.S. author William Pène du Bois. The novel takes place on the Staten Island Ferry and focuses on the relationship between an adult passenger and a young man who spins tall tales in exchange for food.

References

External links
 Call Me Bandicoot at Kirkus Reviews
 The Four Deadly Sins, article on Pène du Bois's never-completed series by Peter D. Sieruta

1970 American novels
American young adult novels
Staten Island Ferry
Harper & Row books
Novels set on ships
Novels set in New York City